Charles Lake 225 is an Indian reserve of the Mikisew Cree First Nation in Alberta, located within Regional Municipality of Wood Buffalo.

References

Indian reserves in Alberta